The American Idols Live! Tour 2010 was a summer concert tour in the United States and Canada that featured the Top 10 contestants of the ninth season of American Idol. The 44 date tour started in Auburn Hills and ended in Indianapolis.

The tour was sponsored by M&M's Pretzel Chocolate Candies.  The tour was promoted by Live Nation for the first time after a seven-year stint with AEG Live.  The show was produced and directed by Raj Kapoor who was also responsible for the 2008 and 2009 Idols tour shows.

Performers

Set list

 Didi Benami - "Lay It On Me" (Kyler England) and "Terrified" (Katharine McPhee)
 Andrew Garcia - "Straight Up" (Paula Abdul) and "Sunday Morning" (Maroon 5)
 Katie Stevens - "Here We Go Again" (Demi Lovato) and "Fighter" (Christina Aguilera)
 Tim Urban - "Better Days" (Goo Goo Dolls) and "Viva la Vida" (Coldplay)
 Siobhan Magnus - "Paint It, Black" (The Rolling Stones), "Spiderwebs" (No Doubt) and "Stockholm Syndrome" (Muse)
 Aaron Kelly - "Somebody Like You" (Keith Urban), "Walking in Memphis" (Marc Cohn), and "Fast Cars and Freedom" (Rascal Flatts)
 Benami, Garcia, Stevens, Urban, Magnus, and Kelly - "The Climb" (Miley Cyrus)

Intermission
 Michael Lynche - "This Woman's Work" (Kate Bush),  "Ready for Love" (India.Arie) and "My Love" (Justin Timberlake)
 Casey James - "I Got Mine" (The Black Keys), "Don't!" (Shania Twain) "Have You Ever Really Loved a Woman?" (Bryan Adams) with Michael Lynche and "It's All Over Now" (The Rolling Stones)
 Crystal Bowersox - "What's Up?" (4 Non Blondes), "Come to My Window" (Melissa Etheridge), "Up to the Mountain" (Patty Griffin) and "Piece of My Heart" (Janis Joplin).
 Lee DeWyze - "Beautiful Day" (U2), "Rocket Man" (Elton John), "Hallelujah" (Leonard Cohen), "Treat Her Like a Lady" (Cornelius Brothers & Sister Rose), and "Use Somebody" (Kings of Leon)
 Group song: It's My Life (Bon Jovi), "My Life Would Suck Without You" (Kelly Clarkson)

Tour dates

Rescheduled and canceled shows

Rescheduled
Bridgeport, Connecticut moved from September 13 to July 9
Pittsburgh, Pennsylvania moved from September 14 to July 21 at First Niagara Pavilion.
Des Moines, Iowa moved from August 31 to August 26
Minneapolis, Minnesota moved from August 29 to August 27
Chicago, Illinois moved from August 30 to August 28
Toledo, Ohio moved from September 2 to August 29
Cincinnati, Ohio moved from September 3 to August 30
Indianapolis, Indiana moved from September 4 to August 31

Canceled
Omaha, Nebraska on August 26
Kansas City, Missouri on August 27
Winnipeg, Manitoba on September 7
Toronto, Ontario on September 9
Buffalo, New York on September 10
Cleveland, Ohio on September 11
Portland, Maine on September 16

Response
The total gross was reported by Pollstar to be $9.6 million.

Notes

References

External links
 Idol Stages

American Idol concert tours
2010 concert tours